Mauricio Alvarado is a Costa Rican sports shooter. He competed in two events at the 1980 Summer Olympics.

References

External links

Year of birth missing (living people)
Living people
Costa Rican male sport shooters
Olympic shooters of Costa Rica
Shooters at the 1980 Summer Olympics
Place of birth missing (living people)